Internet Protocol Control Protocol
 International Panel on Chemical Pollution established in 2008
 Intellectual Property Code of the Philippines